Willie Junior Smith (born November 13, 1986) is a former American football offensive tackle. He was signed by the Washington Redskins as an undrafted free agent in 2011. He played college football for East Carolina University.

He also played for the Oakland Raiders, San Diego Chargers and Carolina Panthers.

Professional career

Washington Redskins

2011 season
On July 28, 2011, the Washington Redskins signed Smith as an undrafted free agent.
Due to the suspension of Trent Williams, he played his first professional game in Week 14 of the 2011 season, rotating the left tackle position with Sean Locklear.
In Week 15 against the New York Giants, Smith would start his first game instead of Locklear.
He continued to start as the left tackle for the rest of the 2011 season.
Smith has received praise for his ability to defend against elite pass rushers Jason Pierre-Paul, Jared Allen, and Trent Cole, despite being a rookie.

2012 season
During training camp in 2012, Smith split snaps at right tackle with Tyler Polumbus and Maurice Hurt after Jammal Brown was placed on the physically unable to perform (PUP) list. He was released on August 31, 2012 for final cuts before the start of the 2012 season.

Oakland Raiders
On September 1, 2012, Smith was claimed off waivers by the Oakland Raiders. On September 27, 2013, he was released.

San Diego Chargers
On November 18, 2013, Smith signed a two-year deal with the San Diego Chargers.

Second Stint with Redskins
Smith re-signed with the Redskins on June 2, 2015. He was released on August 31.

Carolina Panthers
On August 18, 2016, Smith signed with the Carolina Panthers. He was released by the Panthers on August 28, 2016.

References

External links
East Carolina Pirates bio
Oakland Raiders bio
San Diego Chargers bio

1986 births
Living people
Players of American football from North Carolina
American football offensive tackles
East Carolina Pirates football players
Washington Redskins players
Oakland Raiders players
San Diego Chargers players
Carolina Panthers players